The 2009 BNP Paribas Open was a tennis tournament played on outdoor hard courts. It was the 36th edition of the men's event (21st for the women), known that year as the BNP Paribas Open, and was classified as an ATP World Tour Masters 1000 event on the 2009 ATP World Tour and a Premier Mandatory event on the 2009 WTA Tour. Both the men's and the women's events took place at the Indian Wells Tennis Garden in Indian Wells, California, United States from March 9 through March 22, 2009.

Champions

Men's singles

 Rafael Nadal defeated  Andy Murray 6–1, 6–2
It was Nadal's second title of the year, 33rd of his career, and his second title at Indian Wells.

Women's singles

 Vera Zvonareva defeated  Ana Ivanovic 7–6(7–5), 6–2
It was Zvonareva's second title of the year and 9th of her career.

Men's doubles

 Andy Roddick /  Mardy Fish defeated  Max Mirnyi /  Andy Ram 3–6, 6–1 [14–12]

Women's doubles

 Vera Zvonareva /  Victoria Azarenka defeated   Gisela Dulko  /   Shahar Pe'er 6–4, 3–6, [10–5]

ATP entrants

Seeds

 Rankings as of March 2, 2009.

Other entrants
The following players received wildcards into the main draw:

 Taylor Dent
 John Isner
 Wayne Odesnik
 Ryan Sweeting
 Kevin Anderson

The following players received entry from the qualifying draw:

 Robert Kendrick
 Kevin Kim
 Michael Russell
 Todd Widom
 Brendan Evans
 Michael Berrer
 Björn Phau
 Rik de Voest
 Daniel Köllerer
 Michael Lammer
 Santiago Giraldo
 Thomaz Bellucci

References

External links

Association of Tennis Professionals (ATP) tournament profile

 
2009 ATP World Tour
2009 WTA Tour
2009
2009 in American tennis